Fearless is studio album by west coast rapper Marvaless, released April 21, 1998, on AWOL/Noo Trybe Records. The album peaked at #43 on the R&B/Hip-Hop Albums chart, making it her most successful album to date.

Track listing

Album chart positions

References 

1998 albums
Marvaless albums
Albums produced by Rick Rock